Trivial Pursuit  is an American game show that ran on The Family Channel from June 7, 1993, to December 30, 1994. Loosely based on the board game of the same name, it was hosted by Wink Martindale with Randy West announcing.

Format
The show was played in two halves. The first half was an interactive game show, while the other half was a traditional game show.

Interactive Game
Nine players (originally twelve) competed for three spots in the second half of the show.

Round One
Five questions with four multiple-choice answers were asked by the host. The players had 10 seconds to answer by pressing a number from 1–4 on a keypad in front of them. They scored points based on how fast they answered the question correctly, with a maximum of 1,000 points available. After five questions, the six players with the highest scores played round two and the other players were eliminated.

Round Two
This round was played in the same way as Round 1, except the three highest-scoring players won a prize and a chance to play Trivial Pursuit in the next half-hour show.

Classic Game

Main Game
As in the board game, the object for each player was to fill in all of the colored wedges on a large pie-shaped game board in front of them. Each wedge was a different color and represented a different category, with the categories requiring two correct answers to fill a wedge.

In the first three rounds, each player received two turns consisting of a category choice followed by a question posed by host Martindale. A correct answer lit up a wedge but an incorrect answer gave the two opponents a chance to ring-in and steal the wedge with a correct answer.

Round One
In the first round, the six traditional Trivial Pursuit categories were used.

Rounds Two & Three
The second round used either the categories from the Movie Edition or Television Edition.

In the second half of Round 2 (later known as Round 3), a new set of categories were played. (In early episodes, the questions related to a certain year in history.) The category sets used were different each show and were borrowed from multiple versions of the board game.

Rounds 2 and 3 included three special questions known as "Bonus Questions" hidden behind three of the categories—one in one half of the round and two in the other. When chosen, the player who answered an audio or video question correctly had an opportunity to answer a follow-up question which awarded the player $100 and another half-wedge in the color of their choice with a correct answer.

Final Round
The final round again used the traditional basic categories as in Round 1, but the round was played in a different manner. The round started with a toss-up question and the first player to ring-in and answer correctly was given control of the game, keeping it as long as he/she kept answering questions correctly.

If the player in control missed a question, the question was fielded as a toss-up for the other two players and the one who answered correctly received control and the half-wedge, if it had not already been filled in on his/her pie. If nobody answered correctly, another toss-up was played to determine control.

The final round continued in this manner until either a player completely filled in his/her pie, therefore becoming the day's champion, or time was called, whichever happened first. If time was called, the player who had filled in the most wedges in their pie was declared the champion.

The winner of the game received $500 cash, a prize, and a chance to play the bonus round.

Bonus Round: The Trivial Pursuit Challenge Round
The day's champion played the bonus for a trip and $1,000 in cash.

To accomplish this, the champion needed to correctly answer one question in each of the six basic categories within 45 seconds. Each category was played one question at a time in sequence, starting with Geography and ending in Sports & Leisure.

Answering a question in a category correctly caused its respective wedge to light up in the pie. Answering incorrectly or passing left the wedge blank until a question was answered correctly.

Each wedge lit up awarded the contestant $100. If the champion managed to fill the pie within the time limit, he/she won the grand prizes.

Audience game
If there was extra time at the end of the show, an audience member was called on stage and given the opportunity to answer five multiple-choice questions (much like the "Interactive" portion of the show) worth $20 apiece, for a maximum payoff of $100.

Interactive Components
The show launched a series of "interactive" games called playbreaks, all produced by Martindale and his associates. Originally, ten "Trivial Pursuit" playbreaks were interspersed throughout FAM's game show block. Three of them were during Trivial Pursuit: The Interactive Game and one was during Trivial Pursuit: The Classic Game.

A question would be shown on the screen, along with four choices, and the answer would be revealed 10 seconds later. Home viewers were given an opportunity to call a special 1–900 number ($4.98 per call) and play a "TP: Interactive Game" typed, using a slightly modified scoring system, and players answered by using their touch-tone telephone. The winner of each "playbreak" won a prize and competed on Friday in a playoff game against the other winners for a vacation. The ad would last about 100 seconds, as seen by an on-screen clock (even though the clock read ":99" as it faded in).

On New Year's Day 1994, all of the weekly playoff winners up to that point were given the opportunity to compete in a "Tournament of Champions"-style grand playoff for a 1994 Ford Explorer, which aired in between a Trivial Pursuit marathon FAM was running that day. The winner of the Ford Explorer was Alisa Standow.

Trivial Pursuit proved popular in its initial airing during the summer of 1993, as The Family Channel's ratings vastly increased during the 12:30–1:00 pm time slot. MTM Entertainment, an independent distribution company owned by the network's parent organization, International Family Entertainment, planned to syndicate a new version of the show to local stations for the 1994–1995 season. The plan was to produce 130 new episodes and air them along with the 130 episodes already taped for The Family Channel.  However, efforts to interest local stations were largely unsuccessful, and the syndicated version never materialized.

Other interactive games aired on the network – a board-game adaptation of Boggle, the list-oriented Shuffle, and an adaptation of the newspaper game Jumble. Trivial Pursuit: The Interactive Game was cancelled on March 4, 1994 to make way for Boggle and Shuffle, only to return on September 7 and be cancelled again on December 30, along with the entire interactive game block. However, reruns of Trivial Pursuit: The Classic Game continued with no interactive playbreaks until July 21, 1995.

Home game
A home version of the game was released by Parker Brothers in 1993 as Trivial Pursuit Game Show. Some question material was taken directly from the show, and the box cover featured Martindale on the slightly different set of the show's 1993 pilot (which was intended for syndication; producer Jay Wolpert also produced at least one pilot in 1987 with Worldvision Enterprises that was not picked up; Martindale posted both pilots to his YouTube channel in 2014). This was the second home version that was based on a board game itself, the first was TV Scrabble by Selchow & Righter in 1987 and then Celebrity Name Game (based on the board game Identity Crisis) by PlayMonster (formerly Patch) in 2016.

See also
 Trivial Pursuit
 Board game
 Game show
 Счастливый случай – analog in Russia

References

External links
 The Trivial Pursuit Rules Page

1990s American game shows
1993 American television series debuts
1994 American television series endings
The Family Channel (American TV network, founded 1990) original programming
Television shows based on board games
English-language television shows
Television shows based on Hasbro toys